Franz Friedrich Nicklisch (8 March 1906 – 6 December 1975) was a German actor. He appeared in more than 50 films and television shows between 1931 and 1975. He is buried at the Waldfriedhof Zehlendorf next to his brother .

Selected filmography
 Storms of Passion (1932)
 Inge and the Millions (1933)
 The Black Whale (1934)
 Between Two Hearts (1934)
 Joan of Arc (1935)
 Under Blazing Heavens (1936)
 The Unsuspecting Angel (1936)
 Dance on the Volcano (1938)
 In the Name of the People (1939)
 Between Heaven and Earth (1942)
 Five Suspects (1950)

References

Citations

Bibliography

External links

1906 births
1975 deaths
People from Wernigerode
German male film actors
20th-century German male actors
German male television actors
Burials at the Waldfriedhof Zehlendorf